Profiles is a Canadian biographical television miniseries which was aired on CBC Television from 1979 to 1980.

Premise
Various personalities featured in this mini-series.

Scheduling
The five episodes of the mini-series were broadcast approximately monthly at random times between 27 December 1979 and 16 April 1980.

Episodes
 Eric Arthur (architect-writer), hosted by June Callwood
 Douglas Crozier (medicine), hosted by Joe Coté
 Walter Kenyon (archaeologist), hosted by Joe Coté
 Madelaine Parent (union movement), hosted by Sharon Dunn

References

External links
 

CBC Television original programming
1979 Canadian television series debuts
1980 Canadian television series endings
1970s Canadian documentary television series
1980s Canadian documentary television series